China Warrior, known as  (THE 功夫) in Japan, is a beat 'em up video game created in 1987 by Hudson Soft for the PC Engine/TurboGrafx-16. The game received mixed reviews upon release, with praise for its large sprite graphics but criticism towards its gameplay.

The game was ported to mobile phones and the Hudson Channel for the PS2 exclusively in Japan with redone graphics, audio, and gameplay. The PC Engine version was also released for the Wii's, Nintendo 3DS's, and Wii U's Virtual Console and on the Japanese PlayStation Store.

Story
A Chinese martial artist named , whose style resembles that of Bruce Lee, embarks on a mission to bring down opposing enemies and the Dark Emperor, who stands atop the castle  in China.

Gameplay
The object of the game is to walk through each stage while throwing punches and kicks at enemies and objects, which also can be done in midair. There are four levels which are broken down into three stages each, for a total of twelve stages. When Wang gets knocked out, the game starts over at the beginning of the stage in which he got knocked out. Players can memorize the object/enemy pattern in order to get through the stage more easily whenever Wang gets knocked out. At the end of each level, there is a boss fight.

The gameplay and controls are similar to Irem's arcade game Kung-Fu Master (1984), with gameplay also similar to Taito's Gladiator (1986) without the sword or shield held in hand. The graphics utilized very large character models that fill up the screen. They were capable of moving without any graphical flickering.

Reception
In 1987, the character size and detail was a positive selling point for the title in Japan. The release would not reach US until 2 years later. By then, the title faced much tougher competition against games like Last Battle and Altered Beast.

Computer and Video Games reviewed Drunken Master for the PC Engine, giving it a 58% score. They praised the "giant-sized sprites" as "very impressive on this horizontally scrolling kung-fu game" but said "only three moves result in the game becoming ultimately dull." Electronic Gaming Monthly scored China Warrior 18 out of 40, criticizing the simple gameplay and Bruceploitation but with some praise for the large character sprites.

Upon release on the Wii Virtual Console in 2007, IGN denounced the game for its overly limiting gameplay, forcing the player to constantly move right. In addition, while the graphical advancements of the game were prominent, many felt that they were not substantial enough to pardon the game's critical flaws.
In the game's review for Wii's Virtual Console, IGN and GameSpot gave the game an abysmal review, citing bad graphics and repetitive gameplay, among other things. The game was also featured in 1UP's "Broken Pixels," a show dedicated to mocking bad video games. Michael Plasket of Hardcore Gaming 101 said it is "probably best treated as little more than a tech demo for the potential of the TurboGrafx-16 instead of a legitimately entertaining game."

Notes

References

External links
 Official mobile phone version's webpage

Hudson Soft games
Beat 'em ups
Mobile games
TurboGrafx-16 games
Video games developed in Japan
Virtual Console games
Virtual Console games for Wii U
1987 video games
PlayStation Network games